The 1927 Rutgers Queensmen football team represented Rutgers University as an independent during the 1927 college football season. In their first season under head coach Harry Rockafeller, the Queensmen compiled a 4–4 record and were outscored by their opponents, 179 to 103.

Schedule

References

Rutgers
Rutgers Scarlet Knights football seasons
Rutgers Queensmen football